FCV may refer to:

Football clubs 
 FC Vaajakoski, Finland
 FC Vaduz, Liechtenstein
 FC Vestsjælland, Denmark
 FC Vilshofen, Germany

Other uses 
 Feline calicivirus
 Female copulatory vocalization
 Flow control valve
 Ford Crown Victoria
 Forest City Velodrome, in Waterloo, Ontario, Canada
 Fuel cell vehicle
 Mitsubishi FCV
 Toyota FCV